UAAP Season 81 is the 2018–19 athletic year of the University Athletic Association of the Philippines (UAAP). This season is hosted by National University.

Eight member universities of the UAAP competed in the league's fifteen sports to vie for the general championship.

Opening ceremony
The opening ceremony was held on September 8, 2018 at the Mall of Asia Arena with the tagline "It All Begins Here". The ceremony kicked off with an intermission number led by the NU Chorale, NU Underdawgz and the NU Pep Squad. NBA star Stephen Curry made a special appearance and led the oath of sportsmanship for the athletes. Local artists Sponge Cola, James Reid and South Korean singer-songwriter and former 2NE1 member Minzy also performed inside the arena.

The opening games were UP vs. UE in the first game and followed by NU vs. UST in the main game.

A press conference was also held at the SM Mall of Asia a few days before the opening.

Sports calendar
This is the calendar of sports events of UAAP Season 81. The list includes the tournament host schools and the venues.

First semester

Second semester

Basketball

The UAAP Season 81 Seniors' tournament basketball tournament began on September 8, 2018 at the Mall of Asia Arena. The tournament host was National University. Edmundo "Junel" Baculi and Antonio "Tonichi" Pujante were the tournament commissioner and assistant commissioner, respectively. The UAAP adopted FIBA rules on technicals, timeouts, among others. The primary playing venues were the Mall of Asia Arena and the Smart Araneta Coliseum. The Filoil Flying V Centre and the Ynares Center Antipolo served as the alternate venues when the MOA Arena and Araneta Coliseum were unavailable. the University Athletic Association of the Philippines (UAAP) tapped the services of its own exclusive group of referees in Season 81.

Men's tournament

Elimination round

Playoffs

Awards
 Most Valuable Player: 
 Rookie of the Year:

Women's tournament

Elimination round

Playoffs

Awards
 Most Valuable Player: 
 Rookie of the Year:

Juniors' tournament

Elimination round

Playoffs

Awards
 Most Valuable Player: 
 Rookie of the Year:

3×3 basketball 
The UAAP expanded its number of tournaments by holding 3×3 basketball games in the men's and women's divisions as a demonstration sport in Season 80. The inclusion of 3×3 basketball in the list of UAAP tournaments is timely as 3×3 basketball is now an Olympic event. 3×3 basketball may be reclassified as a regular sport next season after the positive responses from member schools who all fielded a team.

The UAAP Season 81 seniors' 3×3 basketball tournament was held on March 2–3, 2019. The tournament venue was the Ayala Malls Feliz, Pasig. and the tournament commissioner was Xavier Nunag.

Men's tournament

Team standings 
UST Growling Tigers competed in the 3x3 tournament for the first time, while the runner-up of last seasons' tournament UE Red Warriors did not join this season's tournament.

Playoffs

Women's tournament

Team standings

Playoffs

Medalists

Volleyball

Seniors' division
The UAAP Season 81 Seniors' tournament volleyball tournaments will begin on February 16, 2019. The tournament main venue is the Filoil Flying V Centre in San Juan City while selected games will be played at the SM Mall of Asia Arena in Pasay and Smart Araneta Coliseum in Cubao, Quezon City. The tournament host is the National University. Yul C.Benosa is the tournament commissioner.

Men's tournament

Elimination round

Playoffs

Awards
 Finals Most Valuable Player: 
Season Most Valuable Player: 
Rookie of the Year:

Women's tournament

Elimination round

Playoffs

Awards
 Finals Most Valuable Player: 
 Season Most Valuable Player: 
 Rookie of the Year:

Juniors' division
The UAAP Season 81 Juniors volleyball tournament started on October 13, 2018. The playing venue this season was at the Ateneo Blue Eagle Gym. This is a change from last season's playing venue at FilOil Flying V Centre in San Juan City. This is the second change in playing venue for the Juniors tournament The Adamson gym hosted the competition for three years since 2014.

Far Eastern University is the tournament host. The Juniors volleyball tournament Director is Ms. Karen Del Rosario.

The number of participating schools in the boys' and Girls' tournaments increased to eight and seven, respectively. Far Eastern University fielded boys' and girls' volleyball teams beginning season 77. Adamson fielded a boys' team starting season 79. Since there are now more than six participating schools in each tournament, both tournaments will have a Final Four format. The UAAP Board decided to move the high school volleyball tournaments from 2nd semester to 1st semester in Season 78 due to the basketball juniors tournament being moved from the 1st semester to 2nd semester.

Boys' tournament

Elimination round

Playoffs

Awards 
 Most Valuable Player: 
 Rookie of the Year:

Girls' tournament

Elimination round

Playoffs

Awards
Finals Most Valuable Player: 
Season Most Valuable Player: 
Rookie of the Year:

Beach volleyball
The UAAP Season 81 beach volleyball tournament began on September 24, 2018. The tournament venue is at the Sands SM by the Bay, SM Mall of Asia in Pasay, Metro Manila. University of Santo Tomas is the tournament host. Beach volleyball is a single round-robin elimination tournament. The tournament concluded on October 7, 2018.

Men's tournament

Elimination round

Team standings

Match-up results

Playoffs

Awards
 Most Valuable Player: 
 Rookie of the Year:

Women's tournament

Elimination round

Team standings

Match-up results

Playoffs

Awards
 Most Valuable Player: 
 Rookie of the Year:

Football

The UAAP Season 81 football tournaments started on December 1, 2018 for the Juniors' tournament and on February 17, 2019 for the Seniors' tournament. The venue for the Juniors' tournament was at the Rizal Memorial Football Stadium while the Men's tournament was played at the Moro Lorenzo Football Field and the FEU-Diliman Football Field. The Women's tournament was played at the CV Pitch Circulo Verde Quezon City. The tournament host was De La Salle University.

Men's tournament

Elimination round

Team standings

Match-up results

Results
Results on top and to the right of the dashes are for first-round games; those to the bottom and to the left of it are second-round games.

Playoffs

Awards
 Most Valuable Player: 
 Rookie of the Year: 
 Best Striker: 
 Best Goalkeeper: 
 Best Midfielder: 
 Best Defender: 
 Fair Play Award:

Women's tournament

Elimination round

Team standings

Match-up results

Results
Results on top and to the right of the dashes are for first-round games; those to the bottom and to the left of it are second-round games.

Finals

Awards
 Most Valuable Player: 
 Rookie of the Year: 
 Best Striker: 
 Best Midfielder: 
 Best Goalkeeper: 
 Best Defender: 
 Fair Play Award:

Boys' tournament
The UAAP Season 81 juniors' football tournament started on November 18, 2018. The playing venue was at the Rizal Memorial Football Stadium. La Salle is the tournament host.

Elimination round

Team standings

Match-up results

Results
Results on top and to the right of the dashes are for first-round games; those to the bottom and to the left of it are second-round games.

Finals

|-

Awards
 Most Valuable Player: 
 Rookie of the Year:
 Best Striker:
 Best Midfielder:
 Best Defender:
 Best Goalkeeper:
 Fair Play Award:

Baseball
The UAAP Season 81 Men's division baseball tournament will begin on February 17, 2019 at the Rizal Memorial Baseball Stadium in Malate, Manila. The tournament host is Adamson.

Men's tournament

Elimination round

Team standings

Match-up results

Results
Results on top and to the right of the dashes are for first-round games; those to the bottom and to the left of it are second-round games.

Finals

|}

Awards
 Season Most Valuable Player: 
 Finals Most Valuable Player: 
 Rookie of the Year: 
 Best Pitcher: 
 Best Hitter: 
 Best Slugger: 
 Most Runs Batted-In: 
 Most Home-runs: 
 Most Stolen Bases:

Boys' tournament
The UAAP Season 80 Boys' division baseball tournament began on January 20, 2018 at the Rizal Memorial Baseball Stadium in Malate Manila. NU fielded a boys' baseball team starting with Season 80. This brought the number of participating teams to four. Since there are now four teams participating, baseball will no longer be a demonstration sport in the Boys' Juniors' tournament. It will be a regular sport with the participating schools earning points for the Juniors General Championship.  The tournament host is Adamson.

Elimination round

Team standings

Match-up results

Scores
Results on top and to the right of the dashes are for first-round games; those to the bottom and to the left of it are second-round games.

Finals

Awards
 Season Most Valuable Player: 
 Finals Most Valuable Player: 
 Rookie of the Year:
 Best Pitcher:
 Best Hitter: 
 Best Slugger: 
 Most Runs Batted-In: 
 Most Home-runs:  and 
 Most Stolen Bases:

Softball
The UAAP Season 81 softball tournament will begin on February 16, 2019 at the Rizal Memorial Baseball Stadium in Malate Manila.
The tournament host is Adamson. Softball is a sport for women only in the UAAP.

Women's tournament

Elimination round

Team standings

Match-up results

Results
Results on top and to the right of the dashes are for first-round games; those to the bottom and to the left of it are second-round games.

Playoffs

Awards
 Season Most Valuable Player: 
 Finals Most Valuable Player: 
 Rookie of the Year: 

 Best Pitcher: 
 Best Slugger: 
 Best Hitter: 
 Most Runs Batted-In: 
 Most Stolen Bases:
 
 
 Most Home-runs:

Badminton
The UAAP Season 81 badminton tournament began on September 24, 2018. The tournament venue is the Rizal Memorial Badminton Hall in Vito Cruz St., Malate, Manila. Badminton is a single round-robin elimination tournament. University of the East is the tournament host.

Men's tournament

Elimination round

 Team standings

 Match-up results

Playoffs

Awards
 Most Valuable Player:
 Rookie of the Year:

Women's tournament

Elimination round

 Team standings

 Match-up results

Playoffs

Awards
 Co-Most Valuable Players: 
 Rookie of the Year:

Judo
The UAAP Season 81 Judo Championships will be held from November 2018 at the De La Salle Zobel Sports Pavilion in Ayala Alabang, Muntinlupa. The tournament host is De La Salle University.

Men's tournament

Team standings

Event host in boldface

Awards
 Most Valuable Player:
 Rookie of the Year:

Women's tournament

Team standings

Event host in boldface

Awards
 Most Valuable Player:
 Rookie of the Year:

Boys' tournament

Team standings

Event host in boldface

Awards
 Most Valuable Player:
 Rookie of the Year:

Girls' tournament

Team standings

Event host in boldface

Awards
 Most Valuable Player:
 Rookie of the Year:

Swimming
The UAAP Season 81 Swimming Championships was held from November 11–15, 2018 at the Rizal Memorial Swimming Pool in Vito Cruz St., Malate, Manila. The tournament host is University of the Philippines and tournament commissioner is __ . The number of participating teams in the Girls' tournament increased by one school with the participation of Ateneo. There are now six schools participating.

Team ranking is determined by a point system, similar to that of the overall championship. The points given are based on the swimmer's/team's finish in the finals of an event, which include only the top eight finishers from the preliminaries. The gold medalist(s) receive 15 points, silver gets 12, bronze has 10. The following points: 8, 6, 4, 2 and 1 are given to the rest of the participating swimmers/teams according to their order of finish.

Men's tournament

Team standings

Rec - Number of new swimming records established
Event host in boldface

Awards
 Most Valuable Player: 
 Rookie of the Year:

Women's tournament

Team standings

Rec - Number of new swimming records established
Event host in boldface

Awards
 Most Valuable Player: 
 Rookie of the Year:

Boys' tournament

Team standings

Rec - Number of new swimming records established
Event host in boldface

Awards
 Most Valuable Player: 
  Rookie of the Year:

Girls' tournament

Team standings

Rec - Number of new swimming records established
Event host in boldface

Awards
 Most Valuable Player: 
  Rookie of the Year:

Performance sports

Cheerdance
The UAAP Season 81 cheerdance competition was held on November 17, 2018 at the Mall of Asia Arena in Pasay. It was hosted by ABS-CBN Sports Anchor Nikko Ramos and "Upfront" host Janeena Chan. Cheerdance competition is an exhibition event. Points for the overall championship are not awarded to the participating schools.

Team standings

Order refers to order of performance.

General championship summary 
The general champion is determined by a point system. The system gives 15 points to the champion team of a UAAP event, 12 to the runner-up, and 10 to the third placer. The following points: 8, 6, 4, 2 and 1 are given to the rest of the participating teams according to their order of finish.

Medals table

Seniors' division

High school division

General championship tally

Seniors' division

High school division

Broadcast notes

 For the 3rd straight season since its broadcast deal renewal, ABS-CBN Sports will provide television and online coverage for all UAAP events. The games will be aired live on S+A Channel 23, S+A HD Channel 166, Liga & Liga HD and their website, sports.abs-cbn.com.

Commentator
Boom Gonzales
Mico Halili (Basketball only)
Nikko Ramos (Basketball only)
Anton Roxas
Billie Capistrano (Volleyball only)
Martin Javier (Volleyball only)
Eric Tipan

Analyst
Marco Benitez
Bea Daez
Enzo Flojo
Martin Antonio
Kirk Long
Christian Luanzon
Ronnie Magsanoc

See also
 NCAA Season 94

References

 
81
UAAP
UAAP